The 1995 Supertaça Cândido de Oliveira was the 17th edition of the Supertaça Cândido de Oliveira, the annual Portuguese football season-opening match contested by the winners of the previous season's top league and cup competitions (or cup runner-up in case the league- and cup-winning club is the same). The 1995 Supertaça Cândido de Oliveira was contested over two legs, and opposed Porto and Sporting CP of the Primeira Liga. Porto qualified for the SuperCup by winning the 1994–95 Primeira Divisão, whilst Sporting CP qualified for the Supertaça by winning the 1994–95 Taça de Portugal.

The first leg which took place at the Estádio José Alvalade, saw a goalless score. The second leg which took place at the Estádio das Antas finished tied at two goals a piece (2–2 on aggregate), which led to the Supertaça being replayed in April 1996. The replay which took place at Paris Saint-Germain's Parc des Princes in France, saw the Leões defeat the Dragões 3–0 which would claim the Leões a third Supertaça.

First leg

Details

Second leg

Details

Replay

Details

References

Supertaça Cândido de Oliveira
1995–96 in Portuguese football
FC Porto matches
Sporting CP matches